Club Esportiu Noia, also known as CE Noia Freixenet for sponsorship reasons, is a professional roller hockey team based in Sant Sadurní d'Anoia, Catalonia. Nowadays plays in the OK Liga, the most important division in Spain.

History
CE Noia was founded in 1951 as Sección Deportiva Noia and changed its name firstly in 1959 to Ateneo Agrario de Noia and finally in 1992 to its current denomination as Club Esportiu Noia.

The club won the Spanish championship in 1988, and the following year it won the European Cup and the Continental Cup. In 1998 the team won the CERS Cup and the Copa del Rey. In 2008 it won its second national cup, and in 2014 it won its second CERS Cup

Season to season

Trophies

OK Liga: 1
1987–88
Copa del Rey: 2
1998, 2008
European League: 1
1988–89
CERH Cup Winners' Cup: 1
1987-88
Continental Cup: 2
1988–89, 2014–15
CERS Cup: 2
1997–98, 2013–14
Catalan League: 1
1989–90
Federation Cup: 1
2001–02

References

External links
CE Noia Official Website

Catalan rink hockey clubs